Baby Looney Tunes is an American animated television series depicting toddler versions of Looney Tunes characters. It was produced by Warner Bros. Animation. The series focused on real world problems and morals that children may relate to, such as sharing, understanding emotions, and playing with others. The Looney Tunes babies first live with Granny, but starting in the fourth season, were cared for by babysitter Floyd, Granny's nephew.

The show premiered as a full series on September 7, 2002, and ran on WB stations from 2002 to 2003. The show moved to Cartoon Network in 2002 (by following suit nine days later on September 16) where it remained until ending on April 20, 2005. It aired in reruns on Cartoon Network from 2005 to 2009. Then it began airing on Boomerang in the U.S. in 2015 but stopped Cartoon Network reruns in mid 2020. 53 episodes were produced. The show is the first preschool animated series from Warner Bros. Animation.

In 2003, a series of direct-to-video puppet films were produced, aimed at infants and toddlers. Two films were released, Baby Looney Tunes: Musical Adventures and Baby Looney Tunes: Backyard Adventures, featuring the same voice cast as the TV series. The films were never released on DVD. However, Baby Looney Tunes: Musical Adventures became available on HBO Max and Tubi later on. Baby Looney Tunes: Backyard Adventures was formerly available on Binge in Australia.

The series aired reruns again on the American version of Cartoonito on Cartoon Network starting on September 13, 2021, being the first show to air on that block.

Episodes

Characters

Main
 Baby Bugs – (voiced by Sam Vincent) He is implied to be the oldest of the babies, which makes him their delegated leader. His leadership however does tend to cause arguments, especially with Lola and Daffy.
 Baby Tweety – (voiced by Sam Vincent) A yellow canary. He is the youngest and smallest of the gang. Depicted as the logical thinker, because he comes up with ideas when the others are unable to. He is very insecure about his small build (which he must overcome in most episodes centered around him) and curious about what he encounters.
 Baby Daffy – (voiced by Sam Vincent) He is the second-in-command of the babies. When he does not get what he wants, he believes he is treated unfairly, not noticing the inconvenience inflicted on the others. But he does have a good heart. He is known to have a fear of robots, and quite frequently, he has made fun of Bugs by making fun of his name and other things.
 Baby Lola – (voiced by Britt McKillip) Sometimes, she takes charge. Her independence is greater than the others and she has more boyish tendencies than all of the other girls, though she wears a purple bow on her hair.
 Baby Taz – (voiced by Ian James Corlett) Whilst not as aggressive as his adult counterpart, Taz is mild-mannered, often mistakes various objects for food, and sometimes breaks things with his spin due to this. He has a sense of humor that exceeds all the others. He is also more sensitive, crying when things go wrong or when Daffy steals things from him.
 Baby Sylvester – (voiced by Terry Klassen) A tuxedo cat who is often shy and anxious. He makes an easy target for Daffy to mock and take advantage of. He is rarely seen using his claws. He likes to get attention from Granny more than the others. Sylvester is afraid of lightning and he hates pickles.
 Baby Melissa – (voiced by Janyse Jaud) She often hangs out with Petunia; the two were abruptly added to the main cast early into the second season. She is a highly logical and practical girl with an easy-going personality, but at times she can be a control freak and clash with the others. She wears a green bow on her hair.
 Baby Petunia – (voiced by Chiara Zanni) She often hangs out with Melissa; the two were abruptly added to the main cast early into the second season. She is the most intelligent of the babies with an adventurous streak. In the episode "Let Harder They Fall", she is no longer wearing diapers anymore like other babies but by the time Petunia wears frilly yellow training panties with a white bow in the middle and "Petunia the Piggy Bank", she learned to save money. She wears two orange bows on her hair.
 Granny – (voiced by June Foray)  Granny is friendly, professional, intelligent, practical, and level-headed. She offers unconditional love and care for the babies. Being the only adult in their lives, the babies are fascinated and inspired by her guidance, advice and ability to overcome problems when they arise with ease.
 Floyd Minton – (voiced by Brian Drummond) Granny's nephew. Sometimes he is overwhelmed by the responsibility he takes on the babies, but he is determined never to let Granny down. He often keeps an eye on one of the individual babies in each episode during Season 4.

Others
Several other Looney Tunes characters have made cameos over the course of the show's run, mainly as guest spots or during songs. Baby Prissy, Baby Marc Antony, and Baby Penelope appear in the songs, “Down By The Cage”, “Paws and Feathers” and "Viva Le Pew" respectively. Baby Marvin (Sam Vincent), Baby Elmer (Brian Drummond), Baby Instant Martians, Baby Gossamer, and Baby Foghorn (Scott McNeil) appear in “War Of The Weirds”, “Bully For Bugs”, “A Mid-Autumn Night’s Scream”, “Stop and Smell Up the Flowers“, and "Cock A Doodle Do It!", respectively. Baby Wile E. and Baby Road Runner appear in multiple songs, as do Baby Pepé (Terry Klassen), Baby Porky, and Baby Sam.
 Baby Marvin – (voiced by Samuel Vincent) An alien toddler from Mars. He appears in War of The Weirds. He is timid and meek but friendly Martian who was visiting for a while. The babies regarded him creepy and hesitated to befriend him, yet Taz was the only one who was receptive to him. The babies eventually realize their error and receive him as a friend, and he finally speaks to them.
 Elmer Fudd – (voiced by Brian Drummond) Appears as a baby in the songs, and as an older toddler in A Bully for Bugs. In the episode, he was a bully who harassed Bugs and stole his candy, and was bullying the other babies too. In the end, he admits that he felt alone and actually wanted to be friends with them. The babies soon forgave him and accepted him as a friend.
 Baby Foghorn Leghorn – (voiced by Scott McNeil) Appears in Cock a Doodle Do It. He's a young, somewhat neurotic, farm rooster, who's ostracized by the older roosters. The other babies visiting, helps him to gain self-confidence and win the other roosters' respect. At the end, he faces a dog with the help of his new friends, and finally becomes a respected member of the corral.
 Baby Pepé – (voiced by Terry Klassen) Appears first in New Cat in Town as a baby, and later in Stop and Smell Up the Flowers as an older toddler. In his first episode, all mistook him for a cat and adored him. Sylvester was initially jealous of him, but got over it when he heard him say his name as his first word. In his second appearance, he is guarding for a garden, but his smell was an issue. The other babies are initially putt off by this, but they truly accepts him for who he is in the end. He is revealed to be friends with Baby Gossamer.

Production
In 1997, Warner Bros. Animation announced the show as an upcoming series. In January 2001, they ended production and the pilot aired on June 3, 2001. They restarted production 5 days later and re-ended production; and the show started as a full series on July 28, 2001.

Music
Underscoring for the series was written by veteran animation composers Steven and Julie Bernstein. They were nominated for a Daytime Emmy (Outstanding Music Direction and Composition) in 2006. They also composed the score for the Easter movie, Baby Looney Tunes' Eggs-traordinary Adventure, writing the music and lyrics for the featured songs.

Home media
Warner Home Video has released 15 of the 53 episodes of Baby Looney Tunes, including the DVD of the only Baby Looney Tunes movie: Eggs-traordinary Adventure.

In the United Kingdom, 4 volumes were released on DVD from July 15, 2013. Each disc contains 4 half-hour episodes.

See also

 The Old Grey Hare

References

External links

 
 
 Baby Looney Tunes at Cartoonito (UK)
 DVD review of Baby Looney Tunes Volume Three: Puddle Olympics and production notes

Looney Tunes television series
2002 American television series debuts
2005 American television series endings
2000s American animated television series
American children's animated comedy television series
American animated television spin-offs
American prequel television series
Animated television series about children
English-language television shows
Television series by Warner Bros. Animation
Cartoon Network original programming
Kids' WB original shows
Child versions of cartoon characters